Dr. Pundalik Dattatreya Gaitonde (3 July 1913 – 13 November 1992) was a surgeon from Goa and an active participant in the Goa liberation movement. Along with Antonio Colaco, Gaitonde was nominated by the President of India to the 3rd Lok Sabha in 1962 following the incorporation of Goa, Daman and Diu into India on 19 December 1961.

Early life
Pundalik Gaitonde was born on 3 July 1913 to Dattatreya alias Mangesh Gaitonde and Anandibai at Borim, Goa in Portuguese India. Pundalik Gaitonde's father Dattatreya hailed from Palolem in Canacona while Anandibai hailed from Borim. Pundalik Gaitonde was the third among nine siblings. His father Datatreya was a local landlord. His younger brother Nanda was also a participant in the Goa liberation movement.

Aged five, Pundalik was initiated into education and he attended a local school. Aged eleven, the Upanayana ritual was performed. Gaitonde pursued his higher education at the Escola Primaria de Canacona at Chaudi, Canacona.

Since there were no further opportunities for higher education in Canacona, Gaitonde joined the A. J. de Almeida College school at Ponda in Goa to pursue his first year of Lyceum.  It was at this school that Gaitonde befriended poet Balakrishna Bhagwant Borkar. During these years, Gaitonde mastered the Portuguese language. But since the A. J. de Almeida College did not have the facility to study the third year of Lyceum, Gaitonde went to Margao.

After successfully completing the course of Lyceum, he joined the Lyceum at Panaji. Aged twenty, Gaitonde delivered a lecture on Albert Einstein's Theory of relativity. This lecture was appreciated by many. Gaitonde also benefited from the various programmes organised by the União Académica in Panaji. Thereafter, he attended the Escola Médico-Cirúrgica de (Nova) Goa to study medicine. Gaitonde went to Portugal in order to pursue higher studies he medicine. He graduated in surgery from the Faculty of Medicine at the Lisbon University, where he was taught by António Egas Moniz (who went on to become a Nobel laureate in 1949) and Reynaldo dos Santos. During the same period, Gaitonde started his independent research regarding cancer.

Marriage
After Gaitonde studied medicine and surgery, he started his practice of medicine in Portugal. He met a Portuguese young woman named Edila Brum Dutra de Andrade. Edila was born at the Faial Island of the Azores and had studied music at the National Conservatory of Lisbon. Pundalik and Edila decided to marry, but faced stiff opposition from their respective families. However, Pundalik's father later relented and granted permission. Pundalik and Edila married in Lisbon and spent their honeymoon at Peniche.

The reason why Gaitonde selected Peniche as the honeymoon destination was that Peniche was the location of the prison-fort where several activists of the Goa Liberation Movement such as Tristão de Bragança Cunha, Purushottam Kakodkar, Dr. Ram Hegde, José Inácio Candido de Loyola and Laxmikant Prabhu Bhembre were imprisoned. These prisoners organised a celebration in honour of Pundalik and Edila. They hosted a meal for the newly-weds.  A woman journalist from France was on a visit to the prison in order to meet Tristão de Bragança Cunha. When she questioned Pundalik Gaitonde about why he had selected Peniche as the destination for the honeymoon, Dr. Gaitonde replied, "Homage to sacrifice!"

Role in the Goa Liberation Movement
He was jailed during Portuguese rule for a protest statement he made while holding office in this region along the west coast of India. He was born in the southernmost district of Canacona and married Edila Dutra de Andrade, a European from the Açores.

Pundalik (or Pundolica) D Gaitonde received his medical education first in Goa and Bombay and later proceeded to Lisbon in 1938 for further studies. He specialised in surgery and did research on the treatment of cancer.

On his return to Goa, then still a territory of Portugal in 1948, he was appointed Surgeon-Director of the Hospital dos Milagres in Mapusa, the main commercial town in North Goa. He was arrested and deported to Portugal in 1954 for a protest during an official speech.

On his release in 1955, Gaitonde returned to India and settled in New Delhi. He worked as the honorary senior surgeon at the Irwin Hospital, and was responsible for the creation of the Cancer Unit, which he headed.

In 1960 he was elected president of the National Congress (Goa), a group participating in the Goa liberation movement by non-violent means. He was the secretary-general of the Conference of the Nationalist Organisations of the Portuguese Colonies at Casablanca in 1961.

In that capacity, he visited several countries including the United States, Brazil, United Kingdom, Sweden and USSR, and was at the United Nations representing the case of Portuguese colonies in general and Goa in particular. His campaigns lead to the Seminar on Portuguese Colonies organised in New Delhi.

After the liberation of Goa from the Portuguese by India in 1961, he became the first nominated member of Parliament for Goa, and also a member of the Goa Planning Board. He subsequently lived in retirement in London, and spent time on the study of the history of medicine and East-West relations during the sixteenth century.

Books
 The Liberation of Goa. A Participant's View of History, Oxford University Press, 1987
 Portuguese Pioneers in India: Spotlight on Medicine, Bombay Popular Prakashan 1983
 The Goan Opinion Poll, 1967  (co-author), Tipografia Rangel, Bastora, Goa
 The Goa Problem, Indian Council of World Affairs, New Delhi, 1956.
 Atomic Energy in Medicine, Indian Council of Medical Research, New Delhi, 1958.
 In Search of Tomorrow, Edila Gaitonde (https://books.google.com/books?id=nUhPGfFg10sC&source=gbs_book_similarbooks&redir_esc=y)

References

Medical doctors from Goa
People from Mapusa
1913 births
1996 deaths
Indian surgeons
Goa liberation activists
20th-century Indian medical doctors
20th-century surgeons